"Khona" is a song by South African duo Mafikizolo. It was released as the lead single from their eighth studio album, Reunited (2013). The song features additional vocals from Uhuru and was released by Kalawa Jazmee Records. In South Africa, the song peaked at number 1 on YFM, Umhlobo Wenene FM, Ukhozi FM and True FM. Moreover, it peaked at number 2 on the Metro FM music chart. In Nigeria, the song received numerous radio airplay on the Beat 99.9 FM and Cool FM. On the Prisoner of Class music chart, the song made the list of the top 10 African songs of 2013, peaking at number 1. Furthermore, it peaked at number 1 on Afribiz's Top 100 chart.

"Khona" received positive reviews from music consumers, who admired its syncopated rhythmic drumbeat sound. The song has elevated the South African house genre to some extent, and was released with the idea that music can influence a large demography of people across the African continent.

Background
"Khona" was written and composed in Zulu by Theo Kgosinkwe, Nhlanhla Nciza and Uhuru. It translates to there or at that place. The release of "Khona" marked the official reunion of the singing duo, who took significant time off to work on their solo careers. Prior to releasing "Khona", Mafikizolo were precisely known for putting out wedding-inspired themes. In a nutshell, "Khona" blends West African sounds with African house instrumentals. The duo opted for a fresh sound to complement their return to the South African Music Industry. Commenting on their newly discovered sound, Nhlanhla said, "We had Afro-pop songs, but we also wanted a fresh sound. Oskido wasn’t sure about the direction and neither were we. One of the things we are worried about is that the new sound is young." In addition to bringing about a new sound, the duo also revamped their physical image. Nhlanhla commented on Mafikizolo's new image, saying, "With Reunited we are inspired by the white 1950s and 1960s culture of roller skates and drive-ins and diners."

To some degree, Mafikizolo's decision to reunite was a conscious one due to the failure of numerous bands that stage comebacks after a hiatus. Theo commented on the downside of reunions, saying, "What makes this scary is that previous bands who did reunions and comeback albums didn’t work out. And if it doesn’t work out it may wipe out your history." While recording "Khona" and other tracks on the album, Mafikizolo admitted to being scared of people's reaction to their new sound. They specifically said, "We were exploring different sounds and were worried about how people would react after such a long time, but it is also what motivated us.”

Music video
The accompanying music video for "Khona" was uploaded onto YouTube on April 19, 2013, at a total length of 4 minutes and 12 seconds. The video features geometric shape patterns and colorful costume designs. It has surpassed five million views on YouTube, and has challenged the representation of masculinity in Africa. Vada Magazine said, "Although Mafikizolo haven’t been forthcoming on any symbolic meaning behind the placement of these dancers, their bold decision to place them so prominently could still be seen as a potentially dangerous idea on a continent where homosexuality is illegal in 34 countries."

Critical reception
Phathu Ratshilumela of Music Industry Online praised the song's arrangement and mixing. Ratshilumela also opined that it "has a catch storyline with an easy to memorize vocals".

Accolades
The music video for "Khona" won Most Gifted Dance Video and was nominated for Most Gifted Video of the Year at the 10th Annual Channel O Music Video Awards, which took place at the Walter Sisulu Square on November 30, 2013. Moreover, the music video won Best African Act Video at the 5th edition of the 4Syte TV Music Awards. "Khona" earned Mafikizolo nominations in the Best African Act categories at the 2013 MOBO Awards and MTV Europe Music Awards. It won Song of the Year at the 2014 MTV Africa Music Awards. "Khona" and its music video were nominated in the Song of the Year and Best Video of the Year categories at the 2014 African Muzik Magazine Awards; Mafikizolo won the Best Collabo award for collaborating with Uhuru.

Live performances

On April 5 and 6, Mafikizolo performed "Khona" at the 2013 Cape Town International Jazz Festival. A day before their performance at the aforementioned festival, Mafikizolo stopped by SABC 3's Expresso Morning Show for an interview. Moments after their interview, they performed "Khona" to Expresso's TV viewers. A minuscule level of controversy arose after their Expresso performance. Many people felt the duo lip synced and didn't put much effort into their performance.

On May 26, 2013, Mafikizolo performed "Khona" at Big Brother Africa: The Chase's launch show alongside Kenya's Stella Mwangi and Nigeria's Don Jazzy, Wande Coal and D'Prince. On June 23, 2013, the music duo performed the song at the 2013 DKM concert alongside D'banj, 2 Chainz, Olamide, Fally Ipupa, Naeto C and Kayswtich. On September 1, 2013, Mafikizolo performed "Khona" at the 2013 edition of the Jazz on the Lake concert in Johannesburg.

On November 22, 2013, Mafikizolo performed the song at the Caribbean American and African Nations Awards, which took place in  Yenagoa, Bayelsa State. The ceremony featured additional performances from Sean Kingston, Samini, King Sunny Adé, Tuface Idibia, Banky W., Timi Dakolo, Wizkid, Kcee, Sean Tizzle and Daddy Showkey. Mafikizolo performed alongside Zahara, Mi Casa, Dr Malinga, DJ Sbu, DJ Zinhle, Big Nuz, Professor, Oskido and AKA, at the Christmas with Our People Music Concert.

Covers and remixes
The album's version of the song differs from the radio version. In addition, the radio version was played on several radio stations in Nigeria, Kenya, South Africa and Ghana. "Khona" has been remixed and covered by established and promising acts in Ghana, Nigeria and South Africa. Nigerian record producer Samklef created his version of the song by interpolating the original instrumental. Nigerian artist Terry G released a cover of "Khona", titled "Ora". Ghanaian rapper Guru also released his own rendition of the song. In April 2014, Nigerian rapper Lyrikal released "Khona Gongo (freestyle)", a song from his second mixtape O.C.D (2014).

Track listing, covers, and remixes

 Notes
 "—" denotes an instrumental

Charts

Weekly charts

Video release history

References

2013 singles
2013 songs
South African songs